Georges David Wolinski (28 June 19347 January 2015) was a French cartoonist and comics writer. He was killed on 7 January 2015 in a terrorist attack on Charlie Hebdo along with other staff.

Early life
Georges David Wolinski was born on 28 June 1934 in Tunis, French Tunisia to Jewish parents,  Lola Bembaron and Siegfried Wolinski. His father, who was from Poland, was murdered in 1936 when Wolinski was two years old. His mother was a Tunisian of Italian Jewish descent. He moved to metropolitan France in 1945 shortly after World War II. He started studying architecture in Paris and following his graduation he began cartooning.

Career
Wolinski began cartooning for Rustica in 1958, and started drawing political cartoons in 1960. Three years later, in 1961, he started contributing political and erotic cartoons and comic strips to the satirical monthly Hara-Kiri.

During the student revolts of May 1968, Wolinski co-founded the satirical magazine L'Enragé with Jean-Jacques Pauvert and Siné. He served as the editor-in-chief of Hara-Kiri from 1961 to 1970. In the early 1970s, Wolinski collaborated with the comics artist Georges Pichard to create Paulette which appeared in Charlie Mensuel and provoked reactions in France during its publication. Wolinski's work appeared in the daily newspaper Libération, the weekly Paris-Match, L'Écho des savanes and Charlie Hebdo.

In 2005, he was the recipient of the Grand Prix de la ville d'Angoulême at the Angoulême Festival. The same year he was also awarded the Legion of Honour.

Motorsport
Wolinski was responsible for the design of the livery of several art cars that raced in various sportscar championships and in the Le Mans 24 Hours.

Personal life
After the loss of his first wife, Jacqueline Saba, in 1966, in a car accident, he married Maryse Wolinski in 1972.

Death
Along with seven of his colleagues, two police officers, and two other people, Wolinski was killed on 7 January 2015 in the Charlie Hebdo shooting when armed terrorists stormed the Charlie Hebdo newspaper offices in Paris.

The asteroid 293499 Wolinski was named in his memory on 22 February 2016 by its discoverer Jean-Claude Merlin.

Bibliography
 Paulette, art by Georges Pichard
 Paulette Tome 1, 1971	
 Paulette Tome 2, 1972	
 Le mariage de Paulette, Le Square, 1974	
 Paulette en Amazonie, Le Square, 1975	
 Ras-le-bol-ville, Le Square, 1975	
 Le cirque des femmes, Le Square, 1977
 Les Pensées, Le Square, 1981
 Paulette, Dargaud, 1984

Other works  
A text on the Tunisian Revolution, « Les Tunisiens sont « sages » », published in the book  Dégage ! une révolution, Phébus, 2012, pp. 164–165, .

See also
List of journalists killed in Europe

References

External links

Obituary in The Independent by Marcus Williamson

 Georges Wolinski biography on Lambiek Comiclopedia
 Georges Wolinski publications in Charlie Mensuel, L'Écho des Savanes and BoDoï BDoubliées 
 Georges Wolinski albums Bedetheque 

1934 births
2015 deaths
Writers from Tunis
French people of Italian-Jewish descent
French people of Polish-Jewish descent
Tunisian Jews
Tunisian people of Italian-Jewish descent
Tunisian people of Polish-Jewish descent
Tunisian emigrants to France
French cartoonists
French comics writers
French comics artists
French satirists
Jewish caricaturists
Recipients of the Legion of Honour
Grand Prix de la ville d'Angoulême winners
Assassinated French journalists
Journalists killed in France
Terrorism deaths in France
Victims of the Charlie Hebdo shooting
Charlie Hebdo people
French male writers
Paris Match writers